The Tennessee Rats was a small club of black baseball players formed in Holden, Missouri running from approximately 1910 to 1926.

Run by W.A. Brown, the Tennessee Rats was almost purely a traveling team, and toured much of Iowa and surrounding states, playing baseball and in the early years, producing a minstrel show to add to the box office take after the baseball games.

Many researchers do not consider the Tennessee Rats a "formal" Negro league team. However, like other barnstorming teams of the time, they had considerable impact on the desegregation of baseball. Today, the Tennessee Rats are rarely mentioned in Negro baseball history, and stats and rosters are hard to find.

Notable players
 John Donaldson
 Jack Marshall

References

External links
 "The Ongoing Research Site for John Donaldson"
 1920 Tennessee Rats Calendar

Negro league baseball teams
Sports in Missouri
Defunct baseball teams in Missouri
Johnson County, Missouri
Baseball teams disestablished in 1926
Baseball teams established in 1910